Cruel Summer is a 1998 album by Swedish pop group Ace of Base, released as the band's third album in North America on 14 July 1998 and in Japan on 25 August 1998 by Arista Records. Flowers was the group's third album worldwide, but Arista Records decided to release a different version of the album in North America, Japan, and Latin America, retitled Cruel Summer. This version of the album featured the new track "Everytime It Rains" and many new versions of songs that were first featured on Flowers. As executive producer, Clive Davis enlisted collaborators including production team Cutfather & Joe and songwriter Billy Steinberg. While primarily a pop album, Cruel Summer explores the genres of euro disco, Motown, and dance.

Cruel Summer received generally favorable reviews from music critics, who complimented its production and viewed it as a superior version of Flowers. Despite this, the album was not a success and failed to crack the top 100 of the Billboard 200, peaking at number 101. The album and its singles saw more success upon their release in Canada. The project was promoted with a series of live television performances that featured minimal participation from band member Linn Berggren. Two singles were released from the album, one of which became an international success. Its titular lead single "Cruel Summer" peaked at number 10 on the US Billboard Hot 100 and was certified gold. The second and final single, "Whenever You're Near Me" received little promotion and peaked at number 76.

Background and development
Ace of Base did not immediately return to the studio as they had with their second album. Band member Linn Berggren grew tired of the spotlight and had returned home early from the group's tour of Asia. The quartet took a break from both recording and promotion; Ulf Ekberg moved to Marbella, Spain.

In mid-1997, the band's record companies asked Ace of Base for new material. Representatives at Arista Records specifically asked for "summery", sunny songs. By Autumn of 1997, "Doctor Sun" had been recorded; it was the first song completed for the new album. The band members test-played the song in several clubs in Gothenburg. Originally, the song featured vocals from all four members, but Ulf's vocals were eventually cut on the final version, which was not released in the United States.

Composition

The band members had resisted recording another cover song, but at the insistence of their British record label, London Recordings, as well as Arista Records, Jonas Berggren chose Bananarama's "Cruel Summer" in what he called "an easy decision". While the original version, produced by Johnny Jam & Delgado, was released as a single in Europe, it was considered unsuitable for an American release. A new rerecorded version, overseen by Arista president Clive Davis and produced by Cutfather and Joe was commissioned instead. Clive Davis also oversaw the production of "Adventures in Paradise". Jenny had written "He Decides" for the new album, however, this song, too, was considered unsuitable in its original form, and was remixed by Charles Fisher. The resulting mix was darker in tone than the original. Ulf composed "more than twenty songs", but only one was used on the released album. Linn wrote and produced a demo titled "Lapponia", which was originally submitted for The Bridge, but the track was rejected.

Arista generally chose songs written by Jonas for the album, although not all of these songs were considered album-worthy in their original versions. Jenny was asked to record new vocals for a reproduced version of "Donnie", and Linn's vocals were cut altogether. The resulting remix was later described as a "Phil Spector-inspired Wall of Sound". "Life Is a Flower" was considered unsuitable for American audiences, despite high chart positions worldwide. Clive Davis ordered a new version, which became "Whenever You're Near Me", a love song, which was reproduced by Ole Evenrude. The record company head also was instrumental in the recording (and re-recording) of "Everytime it Rains". The original vocals by Jenny were found unsuitable, and a version featuring Linn's voice was used instead. Linn was very reluctant to record the song and recorded only one take for the final composition. "Travel to Romantis" was remixed by Love To Infinity and "Always Have, Always Will" was edited for the U.S. release.

The album's European title, Flowers, was changed, and Arista originally settled on the name Everytime it Rains, but retitled the album Cruel Summer following the successful performance of the single.

Artwork
The artwork for the album is the same as the art used on Flowers, however, the album booklets have different designs. The artwork was shot by photographer Jonas Linell. While each band member received one page in the album booklet dedicated to a solo picture, Linn's image is the only one that is blurred. This image is the same as the one found on the cover of the album, but zoomed-in and flipped. Linn was not present for the entirety of the photo shoot and had to be edited into some of the photos.

Singles and promotion
"Cruel Summer" was released as the first single from the album and became a top ten hit, peaking at number ten on both the Billboard Hot 100 and Hot Dance Club Songs charts. The song was promoted in the United States with performances on CBS This Morning and The View, which Linn was present for. "Cruel Summer" received positive reviews from critics, such as Billboard Magazine, who called the song a "potential smash" and Amazon.com, who described the track as a "light, upbeat groove" in their review of the album. Entertainment Weekly was more critical of the song, calling it "pointless" in an otherwise positive album review.

A second single, "Whenever You're Near Me", received little attention, and was not even correctly promoted on the Arista website, where it was listed as "Whenever You Need Me" despite fan efforts to get the mistake corrected. A music video for the song was not produced, however the song was promoted with a live performance on Ricki Lake which Linn did not attend. "Whenever You're Near Me" received a positive review from Larry Flick of Billboard Magazine, who noted that the song was "rife with sunny Caribbean percussion and a sweet smattering of acoustic guitar/synth interplay." He also predicted that the single "should saturate airwaves within seconds." Despite this, the song peaked at number 76 on the Billboard Hot 100 and spent only five weeks on the chart. The track was somewhat more successful in Canada, where it peaked at number 51.

Further singles were released from Flowers across Europe, but no further singles were released from Cruel Summer in the United States. "Donnie" was released as a promotional single in Japan. "Everytime it Rains" was later remixed and released as a promotional single from Greatest Hits in April 2000.

Critical reception

Upon its release, Cruel Summer received generally positive reviews from music critics. Tom Lanham of Entertainment Weekly provided a favorable review, noting that "there isn’t a note out of concordant place, no potential hook overlooked". He compared the album favorably to works of ABBA, describing the album as "perfect pop-Euro-disco balance." Rebecca Wallwork of Amazon.com shared a similar sentiment and described Cruel Summer as a "collection of syncopation and radio-friendly melodies." Paul Verna of Billboard Magazine described the album as "a record of surprising freshness." Gary Shipes from The Stuart News also favorably compared the album to works of ABBA, and described "Everytime it Rains" as a "gorgeous ballad" that "oozes maturity and confidence". In a review for Flowers, Jose F. Promis of AllMusic stated that the track "Donnie" was in a superior form on Cruel Summer, noting that the track was "somewhat under-produced and unrealized on Flowers but truly shines on Cruel Summer." He also noted that the overall production on Cruel Summer was "meatier than on Flowers." Fred Bronson of Billboard Magazine ranked the album number one in the 1998 "the year in music" critics' poll. He preferred Cruel Summer to Flowers, stating "credit Clive Davis for transforming the original release into one of the greatest pop albums of all time."

In contrast, Stephen Thomas Erlewine of AllMusic was more critical in his review, comparing the album to The Sign and The Bridge. Despite calling the title track a "melodic high point", he stated that the album failed "to rival their previous pop pinnacles" and that the album sounded "a little too similar its predecessors". "Donnie", "Always Have, Always Will", and the Love to Infinity mix of "Travel to Romantis" were listed as track picks for the album.

Commercial performance
Despite spawning a top-ten single, the album was not successful. It peaked at number 101 on the Billboard 200 albums chart, dropping off the charts ten weeks after its release. People Magazine reported in December 1998 that only 122,000 copies of the Cruel Summer album had sold, while the Flowers album had received a platinum certification in Switzerland, gold certifications in Denmark and Sweden, and a silver certification in the United Kingdom. Cruel Summer was more successful in Canada, where it peaked at number 23 and was certified gold.

Track listing

Notes
 signifies an additional producer
 signifies pre-production

Personnel 
Credits adapted from AllMusic.

Borje "Buller Bang" – Percussion
Delgado – Keyboards, Programming, Producer
Sasha – Bass
Per Adebratt – Keyboards, Programming
John Amatiello – Keyboards, Programming, Engineer
Andy – Remixing
John Ballard – backing vocals, Vocal Arrangement
Ulf Bandgren – Guitar
Bas-Berra – Bass
Joe Belmaati – Arranger, Keyboards, Programming, Producer, Engineer, Mixing
Jenny Berggren – Vocals, backing vocals
Jonas "Joker" Berggren – Keyboards, Programming, Engineer, Vocoder
Linn Berggren – Vocals, backing vocals
Marit Bie – backing vocals
Marianne Bundevik – backing vocals
Mark Burdett – Design
Douglas Carr – Keyboards, Programming, Engineer
Suzanne Carstensen – backing vocals
Desi "Dezrock" Caruso – Keyboards
Cutfather – Arranger, Producer, Mixing
Clive Davis – Executive Producer
Ulf "Buddha" Ekberg – Producer
Tommy Ekman – Arranger, Keyboards, Programming, Engineer, Mixing
Ole Evenrude – Arranger, Producer
Charlie Falk – String Arrangements

Charles Fisher – Producer
Birthe H. – backing vocals
Peo Haggstrom – Keyboards, Programming
Hani – Producer, Remixing
Nana Hedin – backing vocals
Henrik – Conductor, Horn Arrangements, String Arrangements
Johnny Jam – Keyboards, Programming, Producer
Ulf Janson – Conductor, Horn Arrangements, String Arrangements
Bjarne "Spiff" Johansson – Percussion, Drums
Mads Johansson – Guitar
Jonas Karg – Guitar
Dave Lee – Programming
Peter Lee – Remixing
David Leonard – Mixing
Jonas Linell – Photography
Marian Lisland – backing vocals
Bernard Löhr – Mixing
Matz Nilsson – Mixing
Tue Roh – Fender Rhodes, String Arrangements
Thomas Siqveland – Programming
Eivind Skovdahl – Percussion, Engineer
Joakim Stiren – Programming, Mixing
Stonestream – Drum Programming
Leon Zervos – Mastering

Charts

Certifications

Release history

References

Ace of Base albums
1998 albums
Albums produced by Clive Davis
Arista Records albums